The Horace Mann School Historic District of Norfork, Arkansas encompasses a complex of four Depression-era school buildings near the center of the community.  It includes a main school building, built with Works Progress Administration (WPA) funding in 1936, a home economics building and a vocational educational building, both built in 1937 by the National Youth Administration, and the auditorium/gymnasium, built in 1940 with WPA funds.  All are single-story Craftsman-style buildings, although the gymnasium presents more stories because of a partially exposed basement.  The complex was used as a school until the mid-1980s, and is now owned by the city, which uses the buildings for a variety of purposes.  It is a well-preserved and remarkably complete Depression-era school complex.

The complex was listed on the National Register of Historic Places in 2007.

See also
National Register of Historic Places listings in Baxter County, Arkansas

References

School buildings on the National Register of Historic Places in Arkansas
Historic districts on the National Register of Historic Places in Arkansas
National Register of Historic Places in Baxter County, Arkansas
Works Progress Administration in Arkansas
National Youth Administration
American Craftsman architecture in Arkansas
1936 establishments in Arkansas
School buildings completed in 1936
Schools in Baxter County, Arkansas